Water mouse can refer to several types of not closely related semiaquatic rodents of superfamily Muroidea:
Chibchanomys, two cricetid species from western South America;
Las Cajas water mouse (C. orcesi)
Chibchan water mouse (C. trichotis)
Ethiopian water mouse or Ethiopian amphibious rat (Nilopegamys plumbeus), a murid;
Rheomys, four cricetid species from Central America and Mexico;
 Mexican water mouse (R. mexicanus)
 Goldman's water mouse (R. raptor)
 Thomas's water mouse (R. thomasi)
 Underwood's water mouse (R. underwoodi)
Xeromys myoides, a rodent native to Australia and Papua New Guinea

Animal common name disambiguation pages